Charles Edward McArthur Donaldson (15 March 1903 – 11 December 1964) was a Scottish Unionist Party politician.

He was elected at the 1951 general election as Member of Parliament for Roxburgh and Selkirk. When that constituency was abolished for the 1955 general election, he was returned to the House of Commons for the new Roxburgh, Selkirk and Peebles constituency.

He held the seat until his death in 1964. The resulting by-election in 1965 was won by the Liberal Party candidate David Steel, who went on to become his party's leader.

References

External links 
 

1903 births
1964 deaths
Members of the Parliament of the United Kingdom for Scottish constituencies
Unionist Party (Scotland) MPs
UK MPs 1951–1955
UK MPs 1955–1959
UK MPs 1959–1964
UK MPs 1964–1966